William Harold McBean (28 February 1889 – 19 June 1976) was an Australian rules footballer who played with Melbourne in the Victorian Football League (VFL).

Family
The son of William McBean (1858-1921), and Lucy Margaret Leontine McBean (1862-1949), née Mortimer, William Harold McBean was born at Hawthorn, Victoria on 28 February 1889.

He married Mary Rothwell Dougall in 1917. They were divorced in 1934.

Education
He attended Scotch College, Melbourne in 1906, and was a member of the Scotch College premiership First XVIII in 1906.

Football

Melbourne (VFL)
He played one match for the Melbourne Football Club: against University on 14 August 1909.

Richmond (VFL)
Although cleared from Melbourne to Richmond in 1910, he did not ever play for Richmond.

Notes

References
 
 Scotch's first 66 VFL/AFL players: 54.William Harold McBean, Great Scot, September 2010.

External links 
 
 Billy McBean, at Demonwiki.

1889 births
1976 deaths
Australian rules footballers from Melbourne
Melbourne Football Club players
People from Hawthorn, Victoria